Stormy Weather is a live compilation album by various artists released by The Isis Fund in 1998. The record was produced by Don Henley as part of the Walden Woods Project, with which Henley is associated. It features ten covers of songs, all by different female musicians, and was funded by AT&T and the Thoreau Institute. The CD was issued solely to longtime customers of AT&T and included complimentary and downloadable internet access software. Stormy Weather received three out of a five stars from AllMusic and was received favorably by Frank Tortorici of Sonic.net.

Background 
Stormy Weather was released on May 31, 1998, exclusively available to longtime customers of the American multinational telecommunications corporation AT&T. It is paired alongside downloadable computer software for AT&T's internet access service, WorldNet's Personal Network. All of the performances were recorded live by AT&T and the Thoreau Institute at the Wiltern Theatre in Los Angeles, California on April 16, 1998. The concert was held to expand the mission of the Walden Woods Project, a nonprofit organization created to help the preservation of Walden Woods in Lincoln, Massachusetts.

Rock musician Don Henley organized the event and carried out production on all ten tracks, while Vince Mendoza was in charge of the musical arrangements and conducting the orchestra. At the venue, each artist sang two songs, although only one song from each artist appears on the record. According to The Walden Wood Project's official website, the album contains "pop, jazz, and blues standards" predominantly from the 1930s, 40's, and 50's, performed by ten female musicians. It opens with a version of Elvis Costello's "Almost Blue", performed by Gwen Stefani. Sandra Bernhard sang a rendition of "Is That All There Is?" in an "exaggerated high pitch vocal" with "comic anecdotes". Joni Mitchell performed the album's title track, a cover of Ethel Waters' 1933 single "Stormy Weather". The orchestration was performed by the 66-piece El Nino Orchestra.

Critical reception 

Due to not being commercially released, Stormy Weather was not widely reviewed by music critics. William Ruhlmann from AllMusic awarded the record three out of a five stars, praising the artists' familiarity with the songs. He highlighted Mark Isham's trumpet solos and the covers of "You've Changed", "But Beautiful" and "At Last" as standouts, but had mixed feelings regarding Sheryl Crow and Björk's contributions. Frank Tortorici of Sonic.net enjoyed the performances and commented in reference to the concert that Joni Mitchell and Bjork's collaboration was "hard to beat."

Track listing 
All tracks produced by Don Henley.

Personnel 
Credits adapted from the album's liner notes.

 Ted Barela – assistant recorder
 Chuck Berghofer – bass
 Charlie Bouis – assistant recorder
 Gloria Boyce – artist coordinator
 J.D. Brill – house mixer
 Jim Cox – piano
 Steve Crandall – lighting
 Peter Erskine – drums
 Gary Foster – alto saxophone
 Marcy Gensic – orchestra production coordinator
 David George – set design
 Adam Haller – assistant engineer
 Don Henley – production
 Bob Hurwitz – accountant

 Mark Isham – trumpet
 Rob Jacobs – recording
 Plas Johnson – tenor saxophone
 Jeff Jones – librarian
 Larry Klein – mixing, musical direction
 Edd Kolakowski - piano technician
 Vince Mendoza – arranging, conduction
 Leslie Morris – orchestra manager
 Peter Morse – lighting director
 Neal Preston – photography
 Kevin Royan – lighting
 Ben Sepeda – lighting
 Arnold Serame – lighting programming
 Mike Shipley – mixing
 Tony Taibi – production manager

References 

1998 live albums
Albums recorded at the Wiltern Theatre
Blues compilation albums
Covers albums
Jazz compilation albums
Traditional pop compilation albums